Sanzharivka is a village in  Horlivka Raion (district) in Donetsk Oblast of eastern Ukraine, at  67.1 km NE from the centre of Donetsk city, at about 10.9. km NNE from the centre of Debaltseve.

History 
The settlement was taken under control of pro-Russian forces during the War in Donbass, that started in 2014.

Demographics
The settlement had 8 inhabitants in 2001; native language distribution as of the Ukrainian Census of 2001:
Ukrainian: 100.00%

References

Villages in Horlivka Raion